La calle de las novias (Bride's Avenue) is a Mexican telenovela produced by TV Azteca and Zuba Producciones. Directed by Jaime Humberto Hermosillo, it stars Silvia Navarro and Juan Manuel Bernal as protagonists.

Cast 
 Silvia Navarro - Aura Sánchez
 Juan Manuel Bernal - Román Mendoza
 Sergio Basañez - Enrique
 Omar Fierro - Manuel Ortega
 Julieta Egurrola - Diana de Mendoza
 Arcelia Ramírez - Emilia Mendoza
 Margarita Sanz - Ernestina de Sánchez
 Sergio Bustamante - Luis Cardozo
 Fabiola Campomanes - María Sánchez
 Lola Merino - Lisette
 Guillermo Gil - Padre Tomás
 Rafael Cortés - Augusto Mendoza
 Víctor Huggo Martin - Gabriel Sánchez
 Bruno Bichir - Sergio
 Josafat Luna - Cuco
 Laura Padilla - Matilde
 Edith Kleiman - Marcela
 Tońo Valdéz - Ramiro
 Tania Arredondo - Monica

International broadcasters

North America 
 : Telemundo

South America 
 :
 :
 :

References

2000 telenovelas
2000 Mexican television series debuts
2000 Mexican television series endings
Mexican telenovelas
Spanish-language telenovelas
TV Azteca telenovelas